The Delta Amacuro softtail (Thripophaga amacurensis) is a species of bird in the family Furnariidae. It is endemic to the Delta Amacuro in Venezuela.

Its natural habitat is riparian tropical seasonally flooded forest and savanna.

References

 
 

Delta Amacuro softtail
Endemic birds of Venezuela
Delta Amacuro softtail
Delta Amacuro softtail
Delta Amacuro softtail
Delta Amacuro softtail